The Morocco Pavilion is a Moroccan-themed pavilion that is part of the World Showcase, within Epcot at Walt Disney World in Orlando, Florida, United States. It was the first expansion pavilion to be added to World Showcase, opening on September 7, 1984.

Its location is between the Japan and France pavilions.

Layout
The Morocco Pavilion, designed to look like a Moroccan city with a realistic Minaret, features the only pavilion in which the country's government aided in the design. Guests to the pavilion gain insight on the lifestyle and culture of the Moroccan people through the Gallery of Arts and History. The Fes House shows guests the typical Moroccan house. Inside the pavilion, North African plants including citrus trees, date palms, and olive trees, and fountains can be seen. The courtyard plays hosts to entertainment, including a belly dancing show in the evening.  Restaurant Marrakesh, along with the Tangierine Cafe, serve Moroccan fare, including roast lamb in Tajine, Couscous, and Harira soup. Six shops adorn the pavilion, selling patrons everything from rugs to leather goods, and traditional Moroccan clothing.

Some of the major defining structures of the pavilion include Chellah, a replication of the necropolis in Rabat, and the Koutoubia, a replica of the minaret of the same name in Marrakesh. A replica of Bab Boujeloud, the gateway to the Fez medina leads you to a Bazaar area.

King Hassan II actually sent Moroccan artisans to design and create the many mosaics. Due to Islamic religious beliefs on the content of art, the mosaics contain no representations of people. The government also sponsors the pavilion, while a corporation holds sponsoring rights on every other pavilion.

The Twilight Zone Tower of Terror in Disney's Hollywood Studios can be seen at an angle from the Moroccan pavilion, and the top of the Tower is designed so it blends in with the Moroccan architecture.

Services

Exhibits 
 Race Against the Sun: Ancient Technique to Modern Competition

Dining
 Spice Road Table - Mediterranean
 Tangierine Cafe - Serves hummus, various salads, rotisserie chicken, Baklava along with beverages including coffee, mint tea, slushies, beer, and carbonated beverages. On December 10, 2020, Tangierine Cafe temporarily closed due to lack of demand, and Disney announced that all restaurants and shopping are temporarily closed for a short period due to COVID-19 pandemic.

Former
Restaurant Marrakesh serves from a menu of Moroccan and other Arabian dishes for both lunch and dinner. Select dishes include both chicken and seafood pastilla, harira, a variety of couscous and kebabs, fish tajine, merguez, and semolina pasta. When the Morocco pavilion was being constructed, King Hassan II sent his artisans to Florida to construct the entire pavilion; the hand-tiling performed by his craftsmen can be seen in the restaurant. There is wide-open souk outside the restaurant entrance, and inside, in addition to the tiling, there are brass chandeliers, thuja-inlaid paneling, and bukhara carpets. For dinner, the restaurant features Berber and Chaabi folk music and belly dancing.

Shopping
 Tangier Trades - Sells jewelry, Moroccan clothing and shoes, mirrors made from camel bones, and daggers
 Brass Bazaar - Mosaic fountains and brass and silver plates and mirrors.
 Casablanca Carpets - Offers Moroccan-made rugs, lanterns, and sconces.
 Souk-Al-Magreb - Sells belly dancing how-to's, couscous and the cooking utensils to make couscous, fez hats, and rose water

Former
 Outdoor Bazaar - extension of the Brass Bazaar. Items include decorative ceramic tiles and vases, Moroccan instruments, and handmade baskets.
 Medina Arts - More ceramics.

Entertainment

Former 
 Mo'Rockin - Rock and roll music set to Arabian rhythms April 1999  until September 30, 2015
 B’net Houariyat - Moroccan  musical/dance act January 1, 2016 - March 12, 2020 
 Storyteller Taarji shares the customs surrounding the Moroccan celebration of Ramadan and Ashura. Seasonal Christmas

Meet Disney Characters from the films
 Aladdin & Jasmine

Gallery

References

External links

 Official Website
 Walt Disney World Resort - Morocco Pavilion
 Walt Disney World Resort - Restaurant Marrakesh
 Walt Disney World Resort - Mo'Rockin

Walt Disney Parks and Resorts attractions
Epcot
Moroccan-American history
E
Amusement parks opened in 1984
World Showcase
1984 establishments in Florida